Brenda Lopez Romero is an American politician and is the first Latina to have ever been elected to the Georgia General Assembly. She was a member of the Georgia House of Representatives from the 99th District, serving from 2017 to 2021. State Rep. Lopez Romero served on the State House Education, Retirement, and State Planning and Community Affairs committees. Lopez Romero sponsored 72 bills. She is a member of the Democratic party. After weeks of lobbying by the Latino Victory Fund, Georgia House Minority Leader Bob Trammell and other public figures in the state, Lopez Romero launched her campaign for Georgia's 7th congressional district on May 1, 2019. After a second place finish to Carolyn Bourdeaux, Romero went on to lead the Gwinnett County Democratic Party as its Chair. Additionally, she serves as Senior Assistant District Attorney for the Gwinnett Judicial Circuit handling special projects.

Early life, education, and career 
Lopez Romero was born in the Mexican city of Cuernavaca and came to the United States at the age of five. In 2008, after years of waiting on a backlog, Lopez Romero became a U.S. Citizen. She graduated from Cross Keys High School in DeKalb County. After becoming the first in her family to graduate high school, Lopez Romero earned a bachelor's degree in political science and sociology from Georgia State University in 2005. She then went on to receive her Juris Doctor, with a concentration in National Security and Counterterrorism, from Syracuse University College of Law. Before graduating law school in 2011, Lopez Romero served as a law clerk for the Farmworker's Division of the Georgia Legal Services Program; she then clerked for the ACLU of Georgia's National Security and Immigrant Rights Project.

In 2011, after being admitted to the State Bar of Georgia, Lopez Romero managed the immigration department for the Velasquez Law Firm, LLC. In 2012, through her role as a staff attorney for Catholic Charities' Immigration Legal Services, Lopez Romero represented numerous low-income immigrants and families in times of crisis. In 2013, she opened her own law firm in Norcross, Georgia primarily dealing with immigration matters.

Georgia House of Representatives

2016 and 2018 campaigns 
In 2016, Lopez Romero ran to represent Georgia's 99th State House District in the General Assembly. After beating Jay Trevari in the Democratic Primary, Lopez Romero won 100% of the vote in the general election and became the first Latina elected to the state's legislature. In 2018, Lopez Romero ran for re-election to the State House; she handily beat her primary opponent, Shawn Allen, winning 77% of the vote. She again ran unopposed in the general election and was subsequently re-elected with 100% of the vote.

Legislative tenure 
After being sworn in 2017, Lopez Romero served on the Education, Retirement, and State Planning and community Affairs committees. She sponsored, or co-authored, 72 bills in office.

HB 481 
Lopez Romero was opposed to and voted against Georgia House Bill 481, a bill proposing a six-week abortion ban. She, along with several other lawmakers, brought coathangers onto the House floor to show her opposition to the controversial bill.

HB 896 
In 2020, Lopez Romero, along with several other legislators, introduced HB 896; the bill seeks to allow high school graduates in Georgia to receive in-state tuition regardless of their immigration status. If passed, Georgia would have been the 20th state to enact such a law.

2020 congressional campaign 
On May 1, 2019, Lopez Romero announced that she would not seek re-election to the State House and would instead run for Georgia's 7th congressional district. Upon announcing she said, "We have a unique opportunity to elect someone who reflects the values and the rich diversity of our district...I know that I am the right person for the job.” Soon after announcing, she was endorsed by Georgia House Minority Leader Bob Trammell, Chair of the Gwinnett House Delegation Rep. Pedro Marin, Atlanta Public Schools Board of Education Board Chair Jason Esteves, Georgia House Democratic Chair James Beverly, and several other major figures in the state.

After the June 9, 2020 election, numerous media outlets had initially declared that the primary would be going to a runoff between Lopez Romero and Carolyn Bourdeaux; however, after tens of thousands of absentee ballots were counted, Bourdeaux was declared to have won the primary outright.

In her concession statement, Brenda Lopez Romero stated, "I am about to walk into legislative session and just walked out of our streets as I protested and stated that #BlackLivesMatter, this impresses upon me how vital our work is and that there is still a great deal to do for our state and country. As I finish up my last term in the state legislature (for now), I will continue to fight for the hate crimes bill and justice-for-all legislation, push back against cuts to our education budget, and reform our state’s election laws so every citizen can exercise their sacred right to vote with ease and security. Furthermore, I will concentrate on supporting efforts to flip the 16 state house seats we need in order to prevent disastrous gerrymandering in 2021....No one is voiceless. Rather, there are those whose voices are always heard and those whose voices continue to be ignored. It is my goal to magnify the voices and perspectives of those who are ignored."

Honors and awards 
The Georgia Association of Educators' gave Lopez Romero the 2017 Friend of Education Award. In 2019, she was recognized as one of the 50 Most Influential Latinos in Georgia. She was also one of 21 women to have been selected as one of the Atlanta Business Chronicle's 2019 Women Who Mean Business honorees. Leadership Atlanta chose Lopez Romero to be part of their Class of 2020.

Electoral history

References

21st-century American politicians
21st-century American women politicians
Hispanic and Latino American state legislators in Georgia (U.S. state)
Hispanic and Latino American women in politics
Living people
Democratic Party members of the Georgia House of Representatives
People from Norcross, Georgia
Year of birth missing (living people)
Georgia State University alumni
Syracuse University College of Law alumni
Women state legislators in Georgia (U.S. state)
Candidates in the 2020 United States elections